tc (traffic control) is the user-space system administration utility program used to configure the Linux kernel packet scheduler. Tc is usually packaged as part of the iproute2 package.

Syntax 

 tc filter add dev pppoe-dsl parent 1: prio 1 protocol ip handle 202 fw flowid 1:202

See also 
 cgroups

References

External links 
 Traffic Control HOWTO Dated but still very relevant HOWTO from the Linux Documentation Project.
 Linux Advanced Routing & Traffic Control HOWTO More up-to-date HOWTO for advanced networking topics, including traffic control
 Linux TC Notes brief note of various parts of linux traffic control. English is sometimes broken, but the information is still good.
 tc: Linux HTTP Outgoing Traffic Shaping Example use of tc for shaping tcp/80 traffic.
 Advanced Traffic Control ArchLinux wiki entry for traffic control with tc.
 tcng A proposed alternative to the regular tc program, however it appear to have stalled.

Linux network-related software
Utilities for Linux